The Val di Taro is the valley of the Taro river, a tributary of the Po. The valley lies almost entirely in the Province of Parma, in the Emilia-Romagna region of Italy.

Geography
The Val di Taro is approximately 126 km long, and runs from south-west to north-east. The source of the Taro is on Monte Penna, on the border between Emilia-Romagna and Liguria. It runs into the Po at Gramignazzo, a frazione of the comune of Sissa. The valley lies between the Val Baganza to the east, the valley of the Vara and the Valle di Magra to the south and the Valle del Ceno to the west. The Parco fluviale Regionale del Taro, or regional park of the Taro river, lies within it, and extends approximately from Fornovo di Taro to Ponte Taro.

History

The Val di Taro is traversed by the Via Francigena, the ancient road and pilgrim route from Canterbury to Rome, which follows the valley from Noceto to the Passo della Cisa. From mediaeval times most of the Val di Taro was held by the Landi family, princes of Val di Taro. Their castle stands at Compiano. In the late 16th century their lands passed into the hands of Ottavio Farnese following a failed conspiracy against the Farnese family in 1582, some thirty years before the more famous Sanvitale conspiracy. Claudio Landi, Prince of Val di Taro, plotted with Giambattista Anguissola and Giammaria and Cammillo Scotti to assassinate Farnese, but the plot was discovered; Landi lost the Val di Taro, and the other conspirators lost their heads.

References

Valleys of Emilia-Romagna